Rónald Javier González Escalante (born 6 March 1981) is a Venezuelan professional racing cyclist.

Major results

2003
 1st  Time trial, National Under-23 Road Championships
2005
 1st Stages 3 & 11 Vuelta al Táchira
 1st Stage 4 Vuelta al Estado Portugesa
2006
 1st Stage 2 Clasico Aniversario Federacion Ciclista de Venezuela
2007
 1st Stage 2 (TTT) Vuelta al Táchira
 1st Overall Vuelta a Bramon
1st Stage 2
 6th Overall Vuelta a Venezuela
2008
 1st Stage 10 Vuelta al Táchira
2009
 1st Overall Vuelta al Táchira
1st Stage 6
2010
 1st Stage 2 Vuelta a Bolivia
 3rd Overall Clásico Virgen de la Consolación de Táriba
2011
 1st Stage 1 Vuelta a Trujillo
2012
 1st Overall Clásico Virgen de la Consolación de Táriba
1st Stages 1 & 3
 2nd Overall Vuelta al Táchira
1st Stages 3 & 6
2014
 3rd Overall Clásico Virgen de la Consolación de Táriba
2015
 1st Stage 3 Tour de Martinique
2016
 2nd Overall Tour de Martinique
 10th Overall Vuelta al Táchira
2017
 10th Overall Vuelta al Táchira
2018
 1st Stage 1 (TTT) Tour de Martinique
 2nd Overall Vuelta al Táchira
2019
 4th Overall Vuelta al Táchira
1st Stage 5

External links

1981 births
Living people
Venezuelan male cyclists
People from San Cristóbal, Táchira
20th-century Venezuelan people
21st-century Venezuelan people